Persiaran Raja Muda Musa, Federal Route 2, 2A and 2B is a major highway in Klang, Selangor, Malaysia. It connects Klang to Port Klang. It is also a main route to Port Klang. The highway was named after Raja Muda Musa, a father of Sultan Sir Alaeddin Sulaiman Shah of Selangor.

Route background
The Kilometre Zero of the Persiaran Raja Muda Musa service roads 2A and 2B are located at Port Klang. It has connections to Lebuhraya Persekutuan and KESAS.

Landmarks
 Traffic Police Station
 Pantai Medical Centre
 Harbour Place Shopping Centre
 Tai Thong Restaurant
 Klang Furniture Mall
 La Salle School, Klang
 Hin Hua High School
 Pandamaran Sports Complex
 Port Klang Futsal
 Sri Sunderaraja Perumal Temple
 Masjid Kampung Raja Uda, Pelabuhan Klang
 Masjid Jamek Samadiah Pelabuhan Klang]
 Crystal Crown Hotel, Pelabuhan Klang

At most sections, the Federal Route 2, 2A and 2B was built under the JKR R5 road standard, with a speed limit of 90 km/h.

List of interchanges

Main highways

Service road A

Service road B

See also
Federal Highway
Malaysia Federal Route 2

References

Highways in Malaysia
Malaysian Federal Roads
Expressways and highways in the Klang Valley